Joanne Wallen (born 9 March 1976) is a British born tennis coach and former professional player based in the United States. While competing on tour she was known as Joanne Moore.

Tennis career
Born in the English city of Birmingham, Moore moved to the United States for training as a junior.

Making her WTA Tour debut as a 15 year old at the 1991 Virginia Slims of Philadelphia, she went on to reach a best ranking of 252 in singles and 179 in doubles.

During her career she twice featured in the main draw at Wimbledon, in the women's doubles with Emily Bond in 1995 and mixed doubles partnering Luke Milligan in 1998.

Coaching
Subsequently known as Joanne Wallen, she works as a coach for the United States Tennis Association (USTA).

Since 2016 she has served as the Director of Adult Individual Play and Wheelchair Tennis.

ITF finals

Singles: 6 (3-3)

Doubles: 20 (11–9)

References

External links

1976 births
Living people
British female tennis players
English female tennis players
Tennis people from the West Midlands (county)
English tennis coaches
British emigrants to the United States